Central Medical College (CeMeC) is a private medical school in Bangladesh, established in 2005. The main campus is located beside the Dhaka–Chittagong Highway at Paduar Bazar, Bishaw Road in Cumilla Sadar Dakshin Upazila, in the Cumilla District of Chittagong Division. It is affiliated with University of Chittagong, Ministry of Health and Family Welfare (Bangladesh) and Bangladesh Medical and Dental Council.

It offers a five-year course of study leading to a Bachelor of Medicine, Bachelor of Surgery (MBBS) degree. A one-year or two-year internship after graduation is compulsory for  all graduates. The degree is recognised by the Bangladesh Medical and Dental Council.

History
Central Medical College was established in 2005.

Campus
The main campus is located beside the Dhaka–Chittagong Highway at Paduar Bazar, Bishaw Road in Comilla Sadar Dakshin Upazila, in the Comilla District of Chittagong Division.

Organization and administration
It is affiliated with University of Chittagong, Ministry of Health and Family Welfare (Bangladesh) and Bangladesh Medical and Dental Council
The college is affiliated with University of Chittagong, Ministry of Health and Family Welfare (Bangladesh) and Bangladesh Medical and Dental Council. The chairman of the college is Dr. Syed Abdullah Muhammad Taher and The principal is Dr. Shofiqur Rahman Patwary.

Academics
The college offers a five-year course of study, approved by the Bangladesh Medical and Dental Council (BMDC), leading to a Bachelor of Medicine, Bachelor of Surgery (MBBS) degree from Chittagong University. After passing the final professional examination, there is a compulsory one-year internship. The internship is a prerequisite for obtaining registration from the BMDC to practice medicine.

See also
 List of medical colleges in Bangladesh
 List of Educational Institutions in Comilla

References

Medical colleges in Bangladesh
Hospitals in Bangladesh
Educational institutions established in 2005
2005 establishments in Bangladesh